Khowzineh may refer to:
 Khowzineh-ye Bala
 Khowzineh-ye Baqer